Prodan (Bulgarian and Croatian: Продан) is a South Slavic (Bulgarian, Serbian and Croatian) masculine given name, itself a passive adjective (prodan) from Slavic prodati–"to sell", hence meaning "sold". It is attested in Bulgarian and Croatian society since the Middle Ages. It is apotropaic (protective), found in Serbian naming culture along with popular names such as Vuk, Nenad, Staniša and others. Some adopted children were historically also given that byname. Variants and diminutives of the name found in Serbian culture include Prodanac, Prodanko, Proka, Proko, Prokašin, Prole, Proca, Proša, Projo, and others. Variants and diminutives of the name found in Bulgarian culture include Prode, Prodyo, Prodiyo, Prodanko, Proyko, Proye, Proyo, and others. The patronymic surnames Prodanić, Prodanov and Prodanović are derived from the name.

In Russia, Ukraine, Romania and Moldova Prodan (Russian and Ukrainian: Продан) is found as a surname.

People

Given name
Hadži-Prodan Gligorijević (1760–1825), Serbian revolutionary
Prodan Rupar (1815–1877), Herzegovinian Serb rebel
Prodan Tishkov "Chardafon" (1860–1906), Bulgarian military
Prodan Georgiev (1904–?), Bulgarian cyclist
Prodan Gardzhev (1936–2003), Bulgarian Olympic wrestler

Surname
Yuriy Prodan (born 1959), Ukrainian politician
Daniel Prodan (1972–2016), Romanian footballer
Ion Prodan (footballer) (born 1992), Moldovan footballer
Dănuț Prodan (born 1985), Romanian footballer
Luca Prodan (1953–1987), Italian-Argentine musician
Ciprian Prodan (born 1979), Romanian footballer
Andrea Prodan (born 1961), Scottish-Italian film actor, composer and musician
 (born 1950), badminton player

References

Sources

See also
 

Bulgarian masculine given names
Romanian-language surnames
Serbian masculine given names